Bordertown may refer to:

Film and television
Bordertown (1935 film), a film starring Paul Muni and Bette Davis
Bordertown (2007 film), a film starring Jennifer Lopez and Antonio Banderas
Bordertown (1989 TV series), a 1989–1991 Canadian-French western drama television series
Bordertown (Australian TV series), a 1995 Australian television series
Bordertown (American TV series), a 2016 American animated television series
Bordertown (Finnish TV series), a 2016 Finnish crime drama television series

Other uses
Bordertown, South Australia, a town in Australia
Bordertown railway station
Tthebacha Náre 196A, also called Border Town, an Indian reserve in Canada
Bordertown, the setting of the Borderland book series

See also

Border town, a town or city close to the boundary between two countries, states, or regions